Market Drayton is a market town and electoral ward in north Shropshire, England, close to the Cheshire and Staffordshire borders. It is on the River Tern.

Market Drayton is on the Shropshire Union Canal and Regional Cycle Route 75. The A53 road by-passes the town, which is between Shrewsbury and Newcastle-under-Lyme.

History
Drayton is recorded in the Domesday Book as a manor in the hundred of Hodnet. It was held by William Pantulf, Lord of Wem, from Roger de Montgomery, 1st Earl of Shrewsbury. Drayton is listed as having a population of 5 households in 1086, putting it in the smallest 20% of settlements recorded. 
Domesday also lists Tyrley, which was the site of a castle later.

In 1245 King Henry III granted a charter for a weekly Wednesday market, giving the town its current name. The market is still held every Wednesday.

Nearby Blore Heath, in Staffordshire, was the site of a battle in 1459 between the Houses of York and Lancaster during the Wars of the Roses.

The great fire of Drayton destroyed almost 70% of the town in 1651. It was started at a bakery owned by D. MacTavish, and quickly spread through the timber buildings. The buttercross in the centre of the town still has a bell at the top for people to ring if there was ever another fire.

Sites of interest
Ancient local sites include Audley's Cross, Blore Heath and several Neolithic standing stones. "The Devil's Ring and Finger" is a notable site  from the town at Mucklestone. These are across the county boundary in neighbouring Staffordshire.

The Old Grammar School, in St Mary's Hall, directly to the east of the church, was founded in 1555 by Rowland Hill, the first Protestant Mayor of London. Former pupils include Robert Clive, and a school desk with the initials "RC" may still be seen in the town.

Other notable landmarks in the area include: Pell Wall Hall, Adderley Hall, Buntingsdale Hall, Salisbury Hill, Tyrley Locks on the Shropshire Union Canal and the Thomas Telford designed aqueduct. Fordhall Farm has  of community-owned organic farmland located off the A53 between the Müller and Tern Hill roundabouts. The farm trail is open to the public during farm shop opening hours, and on the path is the site of Fordhall Castle, an ancient motte and bailey structure which overlooks the River Tern valley.

To the south-east near the A529 an 18th-century farmhouse stands on the site of Tyrley Castle, which was probably built soon after 1066 and later rebuilt in stone in the 13th century.

Industry
In 1965, sausage maker Palethorpe's built a new factory employing 400 people in the town. Purchased by Northern Foods in 1990, the company was merged with Bowyers of Trowbridge, Wiltshire and Pork Farms of Nottingham to form Pork Farms Bowyers. The sausage brand was sold in 2001 to Kerry Group, but the factory remains open to this day as the town's largest employer. It produces various meat based and chilled food products, under both the Pork Farms brand and for third parties, including Asda.

Müller Dairy have a factory making yogurts. The town is also the home of Tern Press, a collectible small press publisher of poetry.

Recent developments in the local service industry include the retailers Argos, Wilko and B & M which have all brought new employment to the area. The town is widely considered to be the "Home of Gingerbread".

Supplied by a water source running under the town, two breweries operated in the town during the early 20th century. In 2000, Steve Nuttall started a microbrewery, Joule's Brewery Ltd, a revival of a previous Joule's Brewery at Stone, Staffordshire which had been discontinued in 1974. The new company bought the 16th century Red Lion, a pub that formerly belonged to the earlier company, where the brewery was built, completed in 2010. It produces three core ales on the site as well as a number of seasonal beers.

Education
Market Drayton has four schools:

Longlands Primary School
Market Drayton Infant School
Market Drayton Junior School
Grove School and sixth form college

Grove School is a large secondary school of about 1,100 pupils, all of whom live within  of the town.

Arts and culture
The town has an active arts and culture scene organised through Drayton Festival Centre. This centre was established in 1984 and is run by volunteers. Over 30 years it has expanded considerably and now includes a cinema and theatre, an art gallery and a range of meeting rooms.

The Drayton Arts Festival is held every year in October and looking forward to its 10th Anniversary in 2023.

Sports

Market Drayton Town F.C. play on Greenfields Sports Ground in Market Drayton, which has capacity for 1,000 spectators.

Market Drayton Rugby club play at Greenfields Sports ground, on Greenfields Lane, and are in the Midlands Division- Midlands 4 West (North).

Market Drayton Tennis Club is also based at Greenfields and has three all weather floodlit courts; the club plays in a number of Shropshire leagues.

Transport
Arriva Midlands operates a local bus service to Shrewsbury, Newcastle-under-Lyme and Hanley (the whole route now service no. 64 ). Beginning on 7 September 2012 Bennett's Travel Cranberry Ltd run an evening service 164 to Hanley on Fridays and Saturdays with a day service to Newcastle-under-Lyme on Sunday. Arriva used to provide services 341/342 to Wellington from Monday to Saturday, but this was stopped in August 2016, due to the council withdrawing funds.

Shropshire Council ran a number of bus services under the 'ShropshireLink' brand in addition to the 301 and 302 Market Drayton Town Services but these were withdrawn due to council cutbacks. Services 301 and 302 are now operated by Bennett's Travel.

Market Drayton had a railway station which opened in 1863 and closed during the Beeching cuts in 1963. The railway station was located on the Wellington and Drayton Railway and Nantwich and Market Drayton Railway of the Great Western Railway network and was also the terminus of the Newcastle-under-Lyme line of the Stoke to Market Drayton Line of the North Staffordshire Railway network.

Climate 
Market Drayton was struck by an F1/T3 tornado on 23 November 1981, as part of the record-breaking nationwide tornado outbreak on that day.

Religion

The town currently has five churches.  The largest is the Church of England parish church which is St Mary's Church; it dates from 1150, although it was largely rebuilt in 1881–1889.

There is also the Roman Catholic Church of St Thomas Aquinas & St Stephen Harding, which dates from 1886. There is also a Methodist Church and an Orthodox church.

There is also Christ Church, an Anglican parish church, in Little Drayton, to the west of the town.

Notable residents

Povey family
Thomas Povey, the colonial civil servant and friend of Samuel Pepys, was a Londoner, but a branch of his family lived at Woodseaves, near Market Drayton; the most prominent member of this branch of the family was Sir John Povey (1621–1679), Lord Chief Justice of Ireland 1673–79.

Robert Clive
Nearby at Styche Hall is the birthplace of Robert Clive, first Lord Clive, "Clive of India", (1725–1774), part of whose schooling was in the Grammar School then in Market Drayton. The Georgian house, designed by Sir William Chambers, the architect of Somerset House, replaced the half-timbered house where Clive was born. It was built for his father and paid for by Clive from the income from his Indian career.

Sport

 John Lewis (18551926), football referee and a founder of Blackburn Rovers F.C., was born at Market Drayton
 Reginald Heber Macaulay (born in Hodnet 1858 – 1937) was an amateur English footballer who won the FA Cup with Old Etonians in 1882 and made one appearance for England in 1881 playing as a forward.
 Arthur Morris (born Market Drayton 1882 - 1945), professional footballer, played for Shrewsbury Town and Birmingham City.
 Harold Emerton Edge (born Market Drayton 1892 – 1944) an English cricketer, a right-handed batsman who bowled medium pace
 Ken Summers (darts player) (born 1963) now retired, lives in the town
 David Gilford (born 1965) is an English professional golfer. He lives in the town
 Andy Cooke (born 1974), former professional footballer played for Burnley, Stoke City and Shrewsbury Town also hails from, and ended his footballing career with, Market Drayton
 Benjamin Jack Garratt (born 1994 in Market Drayton) English professional footballer, played for Crewe Alexandra F.C. 125 times

Other notable residents
 Elizabeth Wriothesley, Countess of Southampton (1572 – 1655), daughter of Vernon family of Hodnet, was one of the chief ladies-in-waiting to Elizabeth I of England in the later years of her reign
 William Felton (1715–1769), English composer
 Mary Cholmondeley (born in Hodnet 1859 – 1925) was an English novelist. Her best-selling novel, (published in 1899) Red Pottage, satirised religious hypocrisy and the narrowness of country life. It was adapted into a silent film in 1918. 
 Stephen Morrey (1880 – 1921) was an English-born merchant, farmer and political figure in Saskatchewan, Canada. Morrey owned a hardware business in Market Drayton.
 Sir Alexander Stanier DSO & Bar, MC (1899 at Peplow Hall – 1995) a British Army officer and later local politician

Twin towns
Market Drayton is twinned with:

Gallery

See also
Listed buildings in Market Drayton

References

External links

Market Drayton Council
Market Drayton Online
Archaeological assessment of Market Drayton, Shropshire Hal Dalwood
Memories of Market Drayton

 
Market towns in Shropshire
Towns in Shropshire
Civil parishes in Shropshire